Lindsay Cross is an American politician and environmental scientist serving as a member of the Florida House of Representatives for the 60th district. She assumed office on November 8, 2022.

Education 
Cross earned a Bachelor of Science degree in environmental health from Colorado State University in 2000 and a Master of Science in environmental science and policy from the University of South Florida in 2005.

Career 
From 2002 to 2016, Cross worked for the Tampa Bay Estuary Program as a technical assistant, environmental scientist, and environmental science and policy manager. From 2016 to 2018, she was the executive director of the Florida Wildlife Corridor. She joined Florida Conservation Voters in 2019, working as a public lands advocate and government relations director. Cross was elected to the Florida House of Representatives in November 2022.

References 

Living people
Democratic Party members of the Florida House of Representatives
Women state legislators in Florida
Colorado State University alumni
University of South Florida alumni
American environmentalists
21st-century American politicians
21st-century American women politicians
Year of birth missing (living people)